The following is a list of bands that either were, are or have been associated with the genre groove metal:

{{columns-list|colwidth=15em|
 Accuser
 Acid Drinkers
 Acrassicauda
 Adrenaline Mob
 A Life Once Lost
 Alien Weaponry
 A.N.I.M.A.L.
 Anthrax
 Any Given Day
 A Perfect Murder
 Arakain
 Arkaea
 Avatar
 Aurthohin
 Auditopsy
 AxeWound
 Bad Wolves
 Betzefer
 Bewized
 Bhayanak Maut
 Biohazard
 Biomechanical
 Black Label Society
 Bleed from Within
 Bleed the Sky
 Bloodsimple
 Body Count
 Boiler Room
 Brotality
 Brujeria
 B-Thong
 Burgerkill
 Butcher Babies
 Byzantine
 Carajo
 Cavalera Conspiracy
 Channel Zero
 Chimaira
 City of Fire
 Coal Chamber
 Cocobat
 Coldseed
 Common Dead
 Confess
 Contrive
 Criminal
 Cyclone Temple
 Cypecore
 Dååth
 Dagoba
 Damageplan
 Death Therapy
 Decapitated
 The Defiled
 De La Tierra
 Demolition Hammer
 Demon Hunter
 DevilDriver
 Devilment
 Dire
 Disciple
 Dir En Grey
 Dirge Within
 Disembodied
 Divine Heresy
 Dog Fashion Disco
 Dominus
 Doomsday Hymn
 Down for Life
 Dry Kill Logic
 Droid
 Earth Crisis
 Elitist
 Ektomorf
 Entombed
 Eths
 Exhorder
 Exodus
 Extrema
 Eye of the Enemy
 Flaw
 From Zero
 Face Down
 Fasedown
 Farmer Boys
 Fear Factory
 Fellsilent
 Fight
 Five Finger Death Punch
 Flawed by Design
 Forbidden
 Forced Entry
 Forever Never
 Forfeit Thee Untrue
 Frankenbok
 Fury of Five
 Gojira
 The Great Deceiver
 Grimaze
 Grimfist
 Grip Inc.
 G/Z/R
 Hacktivist 
 Hämatom
 Hamlet
 Hatebreed
 The Haunted
 Hellyeah
 Helmet
 Hemlock
 Icon in Me
 Incite
 Infected Rain
 Inner Sanctum
 Invocator
 Jinjer
 Jungle Rot
 Killer Be Killed
 Katalepsy
 Kilgore
 Killers
 Kill II This
 Kittie
 Klank
 Kobong
 Lamb of God
 Lazarus A.D.
 Living Sacrifice
 Lost Society
 Machine Head
 Malevolence
 Malón
 Mary Beats Jane
 Massacra
 Massacre
 Master
 Mastodon
 Memorain
 Merauder
 Meshuggah
 Metal Allegiance
 Misery Inc.
 Misterer
 Mnemic
 Mortification
 Monster Voodoo Machine
 Mud Factory
 Mudvayne
 MX
 Nailbomb
 Napalm Death
 Neo-Destruction
 Nonpoint
 No Sin Evades His Gaze
 Nu-Nation
 Odd Crew
 Oceanhoarse
 Omega Diatribe
 Once Human
 Oni
 Orbit Culture
 Outrage A.D.
 Overkill
 Painflow<ref>

See also 
 List of thrash metal bands
 List of crossover thrash bands
 List of metalcore bands
 List of nu metal bands

References 

Groove metal
Groove